WEDW may refer to:

 WEDW (TV), channel 49 in  Connecticut
 WEDW-FM, radio station in  Connecticut